Alfred Woltmann (18 May 1841 – 6 February 1880) was a German art historian.  He was born at Charlottenburg, studied at Berlin and Munich, and was appointed professor of art history successively at the Karlsruhe Polytechnicum (1868) and at the universities of Prague (1874) and Strasbourg (1878).  Conjointly with the author he adapted the fifth volume of Schnaase's Geschichte der bildenden Künste for the second edition (1872), and with Karl Woermann began a Geschichte der Malerei (1878), completed after his death by his collaborator.  Besides his principal work, Holbein und seine Zeit (second edition, 1873–76), he wrote:  
 Die deutsche Kunst und Die Reformation (second edition, 1871)  
 Die Baugeschichte Berlins (1872)  
 Geschichte der deutschen Kunst in Elsass (1876)  
 Die deutsche  Kunst in Prag (1877)  
 Aus vier Jahrhunderten niederländischdeutscher Kunstgeschichte (1878)

References

 Lubomír Slavíček (ed.), Slovník historiků umění, výtvarných kritiků, teoretiků a publicistů v českých zemích a jejich spolupracovníků z příbuzných oborů (asi 1800–2008), Sv. 2, p. 1687–1688, Academia Praha 2016, 
 
 Johannes E. S. Schmidt: Die Französische Domschule und das Französische Gymnasium zu Berlin. Schülererinnerungen 1848-1861. ed. Rüdiger R. E. Fock. Verlag Dr. Kovac, Hamburg 2008, .  Available online

External links
 

German art historians
1841 births
1880 deaths
Academic staff of Charles University
Französisches Gymnasium Berlin alumni